Aydo Abay (born May 29, 1973) is a German singer and songwriter raised in Koblenz, Germany. He is of Turkish descent. Abay is mainly known for being the frontman for the German indie rock quartet Blackmail (1995–2008). He has also started his own solo band project known as "KEN".

Discography

With KEN
Have A Nice Day (2002)Stronger (2005)I Am Thief (2005)Stop! Look! Sing Songs Of Revolution! (2005)Yes We (2010)
With DuMondeGun'' (2007)
With Blackmail

External links
 blackmail's Official Website
 DuMonde Record Label
 

Blackmail (band) members
21st-century German male singers
Musicians from Koblenz
German people of Turkish descent
1973 births
Living people